Haddock is a North Atlantic fish caught for food.

Haddock  may also refer to:

 Haddock (surname), including a list of people and fictional characters with the name
 Haddock, Alberta, a locality in Canada
 Haddock, Georgia, an unincorporated town in the United States
 USS Haddock, three United States Navy submarines
 Haddock (software), a software documentation generator for the Haskell programming language